Georgios Chatzaras (born 23 November 1953) is a Greek football manager.

References

1953 births
Living people
Greek football managers
Veria F.C. managers
Egaleo F.C. managers
Aris Thessaloniki F.C. managers
PAS Giannina F.C. managers
Ilisiakos F.C. managers
Pierikos F.C. managers
Niki Volos F.C. managers
Aiginiakos F.C. managers
Sportspeople from Thessaloniki